Justice Haskell may refer to:

Alexander Cheves Haskell (1839–1910), associate justice of the South Carolina Supreme Court
Thomas H. Haskell (1842–1900), associate justice of the Maine Supreme Judicial Court